This is a list of Dutch television related events from 1976.

Events
18 February - Sandra Reemer is selected to represent Netherlands at the 1976 Eurovision Song Contest with her song "The Party's Over". She is selected to be the twenty-first Dutch Eurovision entry during Nationaal Songfestival held at Congresgebouw in The Hague.
3 April - The 21st Eurovision Song Contest is held at the Nederlands Congrescentrum in The Hague. The United Kingdom wins the contest with the song "Save Your Kisses for Me", performed by Brotherhood of Man.

Debuts
4 January - Sesamstraat (1976–present)

Television shows

1950s
NOS Journaal (1956–present)
Pipo de Clown (1958–present)

Ending this year

Births
23 July - Mark van Eeuwen, actor
15 August - Koert-Jan de Bruijn, actor & TV presenter
18 November - Lodewijk Hoekstra, TV presenter

Deaths